The following is a list of notable NASCAR teams that have officially closed down, with their last team name and driver. The list does not contain teams that have temporarily suspended operations. For those, see List of NASCAR teams. Some teams that are listed here no longer run that particular series, but may still be active in another series.

NASCAR Cup Series

Xfinity Series 
AP Performance Racing
A.J. Foyt Racing
Alumni Motorsports
Andy Petree Racing
BACE Motorsports
Bang! Racing
BLV Motorsports
Bost Motorsports
Carroll Racing
Chance 2 Motorsports
Chip Ganassi Racing
Clay Andrews Racing
Dale Earnhardt, Inc.
DF2 Motorsports
Doug Taylor Motorsports
Emerald Performance Group
FILMAR Racing
Ginn Racing
Glynn Motorsports
Hendrick Motorsports
Hensley Motorsports
Hillin Racing
Herzog Motorsports
Hispanic Racing Team
Innovative Motorsports
J&J Racing
JG Motorsports
Jim & Judie Motorsports
Joe Bessey Racing
Keith Coleman Racing
Kevin Harvick Incorporated
Labonte Motorsports
Larry Hedrick Motorsports
Lockamy Racing
Marsh Racing
Michael Waltrip Racing
Moy Racing
NorthStar Motorsports
Parker Racing
Precision Performance Motorsports
Roush Fenway Racing
Second Chance Motorsports
Shoemaker Racing
Spencer Motor Ventures
Team Bristol Motorsports
Washington-Erving Motorsports
Whitaker Racing
Xpress Motorsports

Gander Outdoors Truck Series 
Addington Racing
Andy Petree Racing
Bang! Racing
BKR Racing
Brad Keselowski Racing
Clean Line Racing
CJ Racing
Dale Earnhardt, Inc.
Faith Motorsports
Fiddleback Racing
Germain Racing
Glynn Motorsports
Hendrick Motorsports
Joe Gibbs Racing
Kevin Harvick Incorporated
Impact Motorsports
Innovative Motorsports
Joe Gibbs Racing
JR Motorsports
MacDonald Motorsports
Mansion Motorsports
McGlynn Racing
Petty Enterprises
Phelon Racing
Red Horse Racing
Richard Childress Racing
Richardson Motorsports
Roadrunner Motorsports
Roehig Racing
Roush Fenway Racing
South Point Racing
Spears Motorsports
Sutton Motorsports
Tagsby Racing
Team EJP Racing
Team Rensi Motorsports
TKO Motorsports
Ultra Motorsports
Ware Racing Enterprises
Woodard Racing
Victory in Jesus Racing

Other series 
Brad Jones Racing
Garry Rogers Motorsport

 
NASCAR teams, defunct
NASCAR teams